Flying Camel Football Team was a Taiwanese football team. The team was established on July 21, 1973 and belonged to the Combined Logistics Command of the Republic of China. They had played in Taiwan's first-ranked National Football League since 1982 and won 5 championships (1983, 1984, 1985, 1988, and 1993) before disbandment.

Honours 
 National Football League
 Champions (5): 1983, 1984, 1985, 1988, 1993
 Runners-up (3): 1986, 1987, 1989
 CTFA Cup
 Champions (5): 1974, 1979, 1980, 1981, 1982

See also
 Football in Taiwan

1973 establishments in Taiwan
Association football clubs established in 1973
Football clubs in Taiwan
Military association football clubs in Taiwan